Blackfoot Trail is a super-4 expressway in Calgary, Alberta.  It is named for the Blackfoot Confederacy, and more specifically the Siksika Nation, located east of Calgary.  The road runs from 17 Avenue SE in the north, where Blackfoot Trail meets Deerfoot Trail (Highway 2), to Southland Drive in the south. It is the historical alignment of Highway 2 in south Calgary.  The section of Blackfoot Trail between 19 Street SE and Deerfoot Trail is a former alignment, and still technically part of, 17 Avenue SE; however, it is generally referred to as being part of Blackfoot Trail.

History

Prior to the construction of Deerfoot Trail, which was originally named the Blackfoot Trail Freeway, Blackfoot Trail was the routing of Highway 2 through the southern portion of Calgary.  It continued south to 66 Avenue SE (present-day Glenmore Trail) and Macleod Trail.  At the north end, Highway 2 continued east on 17 Avenue SE, before turning north to Barlow Trail.

Major intersections
From south to north.

See also

Transportation in Calgary

References

Roads in Calgary